Waldemar Koch (25 September 1880 – 15 May 1963) was a German liberal politician and economist.

He was born in Bad Harzburg, Duchy of Brunswick. Koch studied Economics, Philosophy and History at Berlin.  He received a doctorate in 1907 for a dissertation entitled "Consolidation in the German Electrical Indudstry" ("Konzentration in der dt. Elektroindustrie").   Between 1907 and 1910 he undertook an extensive study tour that included Russia, China and the United States.

He also worked for AEG from 1905 to 1907, returning to the company to head a London-based company for them from 1910 to 1914.

During World War I he served in the German army. In 1918 he joined the German Democratic Party (Deutsche Demokratische Partei). Between the wars he worked as an economist and professor on the Technical University of Berlin.

After World War II he co-founded the Liberal Democratic Party of Germany (LDPD) in the Soviet Occupied Zone (SBZ). In 1945 he was briefly the Chairman of the LDPD, but the Soviets forced him to resign after a few months. He opposed the land reform plans of the Soviet authorities and the Socialist Unity Party (SED). Koch was a member of the LDPD's executive committee until 1948.

In 1949 he went to West Germany (West Berlin) and again worked as an economics professor. From 1948 to 1956 Koch was a member of the liberal FDP (Free Democratic Party).

See also
 Liberal Democratic Party of Germany
 Liberalism

References

External links
 

1880 births
1963 deaths
People from Goslar (district)
German Democratic Party politicians
Liberal Democratic Party of Germany politicians
Academic staff of the Technical University of Berlin